Agarathos Monastery is an Eastern Orthodox monastery situated near the village of Sgourokefali (part of Episkopi municipal unit) of the Heraklion regional unit in central Crete, Greece. It is built on a lush green location at an altitude of 538 meters, approximately 24 km east of Heraklion.

History

Agarathos is one of the oldest monasteries in Crete but its exact date of establishment is not known. Most probably, it was established during the second Byzantine period and originally belonged to the Kallergis family. According to tradition, it received its name from a Jerusalem sage bush (agarathia in the Cretan dialect), under which an old icon of Virgin Mary was found. The earliest written reference to the monastery dates back to 1532 and the Venetian period. During that time, Agarathos was a very wealthy monastery, with many of its monks originating from Kythira. During the Ottoman occupation of Crete, the monastery often served as a local revolutionary center and suffered several retaliatory attacks as a result. Several important figures, among which Cyril Lucaris, Meletius Pegas, Joseph Bryennios, Gerasimos Palaiokapas and Theodore of Alexandria, have been enrolled as monks at Agarathos.

Architecture

Agarathos monastery is built with a fortified architecture. The main building (katholikon) is a two-nave church that was erected on the location of an older one and was inaugurated in 1894. One nave is dedicated to Kimisis and the other to St. Minas. In 1935, the church was declared as a preservable monument. An old church dedicated to St. Raphael is located outside the courtyard.

Current status

Today, Agarathos functions as a male monastery. According to the 2001 census, it had 19 monks.

References

Buildings and structures in Heraklion (regional unit)
Monasteries in Crete
Greek Orthodox monasteries in Greece